Iota Cassiopeiae (ι Cas, ι Cassiopeiae) is a star system in the constellation Cassiopeia. The system has a combined apparent magnitude of 4.53, making it visible to the naked eye. Based on its parallax, it is located about 133 light-years (41 parsecs) from Earth.

Components

Iota Cassiopeiae is known to be a quintuple star system. The brightest star system, ι Cassiopeiae A, contains a white-colored A-type main-sequence star with a mean apparent magnitude of +4.61. The primary is itself a tighter binary star system. The two stars were resolved by adaptive optics. These are designated Aa and Ab (although confusingly they may also be labeled as A and Aa, respectively). The primary is classified as an Alpha2 Canum Venaticorum-type variable star and the brightness of the system varies from magnitude +4.45 to +4.53 with a period of 1.74 days, because of its magnetic field. The orbital period of the system is about 49 years.

ι Cassiopeiae B is a yellow-white F-type main sequence dwarf with an apparent magnitude of +6.87. It orbits around ι Cassiopeiae A approximately every 2,400 years with a semi-major axis of around 6.5 arcseconds, but the orbit is not very well constrained. This object may be causing Kozai–Lidov cycles in the inner orbital pair.

ι Cassiopeiae C is itself another binary, designated Ca and Cb, or just C and c. It comprises two stars, a K-type star and an M-type star. It is currently at an angular distance of about 7 arcseconds from the AB pair. Since the semimajor axis of the AB orbit is about 6.5 arcseconds, the true semimajor axis of C's orbit around them is thought to be significantly larger than 7 arcseconds.

References

Alpha2 Canum Venaticorum variables
Cassiopeiae, Iota
Cassiopeia (constellation)
4
Spectroscopic binaries
A-type main-sequence stars
F-type main-sequence stars
G-type main-sequence stars
0707
015089
011569
Durchmusterung objects
Ap stars